The Guianan tyrannulet (Zimmerius acer) is a species of bird in the family Tyrannidae, the tyrant flycatchers. It is found in forests in the east Amazon Basin and northeastern Brazil. Until recently, it was considered a subspecies of the slender-footed tyrannulet.

References

Guianan tyrannulet
Birds of the Amazon Basin
Birds of the Caatinga
Birds of the Guianas
Guianan tyrannulet
Guianan tyrannulet
Guianan tyrannulet
Birds of Brazil